Thrasamund (450–523), King of the Vandals and Alans (496–523), was the fourth king of the North African Kingdom of the Vandals. He reigned longer than any other Vandal king in Africa other than his grandfather Genseric.

Thrasamund was the third son born to Genseric's fourth son, Gento, and became king in 496 after all of Genseric's sons and his own brother, King Gunthamund, had died. Upon Gunthamund's death, he was one of only two living grandsons of Genseric, and inherited the throne in accordance with a law enacted by his grandfather, which bestowed the kingship on the eldest male member of a deceased king's family. 

Theoderic the Great married his widowed sister Amalafrida to Thrasamund, providing a dowry consisting of the promontory of Lilybaeum in Sicily, and a retinue of a thousand elite troops and five thousand armed retainers. Herwig Wolfram believes this happened in 500, "immediately after his [Theoderic] Roman tricennial". Despite this alliance, Thrasamund failed to aid Theoderic when the Byzantine Navy ravaged the coast of southern Italy, preventing him from coming to the assistance of King Alaric of the Visigoths in the Battle of Vouillé, which contributed to Alaric's defeat.

Procopius describes a battle between the Berbers of Tripoli under Cabaon and the Vandals, in which the Berbers used unusual tactics to defeat the Vandal cavalry. In the final year of his reign, the important port city of Leptis Magna was sacked by the Berbers.

Thrasamund also ended many years of persecution of the Catholic Church which had begun under his uncle Huneric, a move which improved the Vandals' relations with the Byzantine Empire. Procopius states that he was "a very special friend of the Emperor Anastasius."

Thrasamund died in 523 and was succeeded by his cousin Hilderic, the firstborn son of Huneric.

References 

Kings of the Vandals
450 births
523 deaths
5th-century monarchs in Africa
6th-century monarchs in Africa